Mitochondrial methionyl-tRNA formyltransferase is a protein that in humans is encoded by the MTFMT gene.

The protein encoded by this nuclear gene localizes to the mitochondrion, where it catalyzes the formylation of methionyl-tRNA. Recessive-type mutations in MTFMT have been shown to cause mitochondrial disease.

Model organisms

Model organisms have been used in the study of MTFMT function. A conditional knockout mouse line, called Mtfmttm1a(KOMP)Wtsi was generated as part of the International Knockout Mouse Consortium program — a high-throughput mutagenesis project to generate and distribute animal models of disease to interested scientists — at the Wellcome Trust Sanger Institute.

Male and female animals underwent a standardized phenotypic screen to determine the effects of deletion. Twenty six tests were carried out on mutant mice and two significant abnormalities were observed.  During gestation homozygous mutant embryos displayed lethal growth retardation and oedema. In a separate study, no homozygous animals were observed at weaning. The remaining tests were carried out on adult heterozygous mutant animals, but no further abnormalities were seen.

References

Further reading 

Genes mutated in mice